Peter Ross Landry is a Canadian retired police officer and politician.

A native of Trenton, Nova Scotia, Landry is a retired police officer, having served in the Royal Canadian Mounted Police.

Political career
In December 2008, Landry successfully ran for the Nova Scotia New Democratic Party (NDP) nomination in the provincial riding of Pictou Centre. Landry was elected in the 2009 provincial election and represented the riding until his defeat in the 2013 provincial election.

Landry was appointed to the Executive Council of Nova Scotia on June 19, 2009 where he served as Minister of Justice and Attorney General of Nova Scotia until October 22, 2013.

On July 13, 2015, Landry announced that he was seeking the New Democratic Party nomination in the Central Nova riding for the 42nd Canadian federal election. He won the nomination on July 26; in the election on October 19, he finished in third place behind Liberal Sean Fraser and Conservative Fred DeLorey.

References

Year of birth missing (living people)
Living people
Nova Scotia New Democratic Party MLAs
Members of the Executive Council of Nova Scotia
People from Pictou County
Royal Canadian Mounted Police officers
New Democratic Party candidates for the Canadian House of Commons
Nova Scotia candidates for Member of Parliament
21st-century Canadian politicians
Attorneys General of Nova Scotia